Lago del Gattero is a lake in the Province of Pisa, Tuscany, Italy.

Lakes of Tuscany